Belonoglanis brieni is a species of loach catfish that is probably endemic to the Democratic Republic of the Congo where it is found around Pool Malebo with questionable occurrence in the Republic of the Congo. It reaches a length of 5 cm.

References 
 

Amphiliidae
Fish of Africa
Endemic fauna of the Democratic Republic of the Congo
Taxa named by Max Poll
Fish described in 1959